"I'm Less Here" is a stand-alone single released by alternative rock band Mazzy Star for Record Store Day 2014, and was the band's first release of new material since their previous album, Seasons of Your Day. The track had previously been performed live under the name "It Speaks of Distance," with its first known performance dating back to March 1994. The A-side was backed by another previously unreleased song, titled "Things". The day before the single's release, the band posted a music video for the track on their official Vevo account.

Single release
"I'm Less Here" is the first Record Store Day release issued by Mazzy Star. The single was pressed on coke bottle-clear 7" vinyl and was limited to 3,000 copies worldwide. In the United States, "I'm Less Here" was listed as a 'Record Store Day First'; it was exclusive to independent retailers on the day of release, and was made available to other retailers at a later date. The single was released as a digital download worldwide on May 20, 2014.

Track listing
7" single (Record Store Day release)
 "I'm Less Here" - 4:15
 "Things" - 3:16

Credits and personnel

Musicians
 David Roback — instrumentation, producer, engineer, mixing
 Hope Sandoval — vocals, instrumentation, producer, engineer, mixing
 Colm Ó Cíosóig — instrumentation

Production
 Barry Bödeker — artwork
 Mark Chaleki — mastering
 Frank Gironda — management

Credits adapted from the vinyl liner notes.

Charts

Release history

References

Record Store Day releases
2014 singles
2014 songs
Mazzy Star songs